Shahrdari Saveh Futsal Club is an Iranian professional futsal club based in Saveh.

History 

The club was originally known as Saveh Shen, competing in the 2nd Division since the 2006. In the first season of 2007–08 Iran Futsal's 1st Division it was renamed Tarbiat Badani Saveh due to change of sponsorship. In the 2008–09 Iran Futsal's 1st Division they were renamed again to Zar Sim Saveh. They were once again renamed for the 2010–11 to Shahrdari Saveh.

Season-by-season 
The table below chronicles the achievements of the Club in various competitions.

Last updated: 16 July 2022

Honours 

 Iran Futsal's 1st Division
 Champions (1): 2010–11
 Runners-up (1): 2015–16
 Iran Futsal's 2nd Division
 Champions (1): 2007

Players

Current squad

Notable players

Personnel

Current technical staff

Last updated: 7 December 2022

References 

Futsal clubs in Iran
Sport in Saveh
Futsal clubs established in 2006
2006 establishments in Iran